The Pima County Joint Technical Education District is a joint technological education district mostly serving schools in Pima County, Arizona, though its membership also includes one school district in Pinal County and one in Santa Cruz County.

Member school districts
Ajo Unified School District
Amphitheater Unified School District
Baboquivari Unified School District
Catalina Foothills Unified School District
Flowing Wells Unified School District
Mammoth-San Manuel Unified School District
Marana Unified School District
Sahuarita Unified School District
Santa Cruz Valley Unified School District
Sunnyside Unified School District
Tanque Verde Unified School District
Tucson Unified School District
Vail Unified School District

References

External links

School districts in Pima County, Arizona